The 2009 Davidoff Swiss Indoors was a men's tennis tournament played on indoor hard courts. It was the 40th edition of the event known that year as the Davidoff Swiss Indoors, and was part of the 500 Series of the 2009 ATP World Tour. It was held at the St. Jakobshalle in Basel, Switzerland, from 2 November through 8 November 2009. Novak Djokovic won the singles title.

ATP entrants

Seeds

 Seeds are based on the rankings of October 26, 2009.

Other entrants
The following players received wildcards into the singles main draw:
  Stéphane Bohli
  Marco Chiudinelli
  Marin Čilić

The following players received entry from the qualifying draw:
  Evgeny Korolev
  Michael Lammer
  Peter Luczak
  Olivier Rochus

The following player received the lucky loser spot:
  Florent Serra

Finals

Singles

 Novak Djokovic defeated  Roger Federer, 6–4, 4–6, 6–2
It was Djokovic's 4th title of the year and 15th of his career.

Doubles

 Daniel Nestor /  Nenad Zimonjić defeated  Bob Bryan /  Mike Bryan, 6–2, 6–3.

References

External links
Official website

 
2009 ATP World Tour
2009